Finsbury Growth & Income Trust is a large investment fund focused on investing in the securities of UK listed companies. Established in January 1926, the company is a constituent of the FTSE 250 Index. The fund is managed by Lindsell Train.

References

External links 
 Official site

Financial services companies established in 1926
Investment management companies of the United Kingdom
1926 establishments in England